Cipressa is a comune (municipality) in the Province of Imperia in the Italian region Liguria, located about  southwest of Genoa and about  southwest of Imperia.

Cipressa borders the following municipalities: Civezza, Costarainera, Pietrabruna, Pompeiana, San Lorenzo al Mare, Santo Stefano al Mare, and Terzorio.

Demographic evolution

References

Cities and towns in Liguria
Milan–San Remo